Redball is a 1999 Australian film.

Jon Hewitt wrote the script after seeing Belinda McClory in Janus, which was produced and aired on ABC TV between 1994 and 1995.

Most of the budget came from private sources with $100,000 from Film Victoria. The movie was shot on Mini-DV.

Synopsis
Against a background of ongoing and systemic corruption, Victoria Police detectives Wilson and Walsh are tasked with solving a series of child murders committed in Melbourne by a serial killer dubbed "Mr. Creep". The film is also dispersed with scenes about a dead body found floating in the Yarra River, where more and more senior police officials instruct it to be ignored and send further downstream, reflecting the corruption and apathy shown by police throughout the film.

Cast
 Belinda McClory as Det. JJ Wilson
 John Brumpton as Det. Robbie Walsh
 Frank Magree as Det. Chris Hill
 Robert Morgan as Senior Det. Mike Brown
 Dan Wyllie as Ronny Sprinks

References

External links

Redball at Urban Cinefile
Redball at Oz Movies

Australian thriller films
1999 films
Films set in Melbourne
1990s serial killer films
Australian serial killer films
1999 thriller films
1990s English-language films
Films directed by Jon Hewitt
1990s Australian films